William E. Doolittle (born September 3, 1947 in Texas, USA) is an American geographer who is prominent among the fourth generation of the Berkeley School of Latin Americanist Geography. He is currently the Erich W. Zimmermann Regents Professor in Geography at the Department of Geography and the Environment at University of Texas at Austin.  He specializes in landscapes and agricultural technology in the American Southwest and Mexico.

Background
Doolittle attended Texas Christian University, Fort Worth, Texas and obtained a B.A. in Government and Geography (1974).  
He then studied at the University of Missouri, Columbia (M.A.  1976) and received his Ph.D. in 1979 from the University of Oklahoma, studying with B.L.Turner II, reportedly struggling financially with a family to support. He taught for one year at Mississippi State University. He joined the UT Geography Department in 1981. He has served as an undergraduate advisor, graduate advisor (receiving UT's Outstanding Graduate Advisor Award in 2004), and Department chair.

He was a visiting professor at Brown University in 1997, and a Fulbright Senior Specialist at Stockholm University in 2007.

He has graduated a number of doctoral students including Andrew Sluyter (1995).

Research interests
Doolittle's research interests include landscapes, histories, and agricultural technologies in arid lands, particularly the American Southwest and Mexico. His research focuses on technologies associated with landscape transformations for food production in dry lands. His work on aqueducts is described in a film.

Awards
 Carl O. Sauer Distinguished Scholarship Award, Conference of Latin Americanist Geographers, 1994.
Outstanding Service Award for 2004, Conference of Latin Americanist Geographers (CLAG)
 Netting award, 2003, Cultural and Political Ecology Group, Association of American Geographers. 
 Fellow, American Association for the Advancement of Science (2005)
Distinguished Scholarship Honors, Association of American Geographers (2006)
 Fulbright Award, Stockholm University, 2007
 Honorary doctorate, Stockholm University, 2015

Publications

Books
Pre-Hispanic Occupance in the Valley of Sonora, Mexico: Archaeological Confirmation of Early Spanish Reports. Tucson: Anthropological Papers of the University of Arizona 48 (1988).
Canal Irrigation in Prehistoric Mexico: The Sequence of Technological Change. Austin:The University of Texas Press (1990).
Cultivated Landscapes of Native North America. Oxford: Oxford University Press (2000).
The Safford Valley Grids: Prehistoric Cultivation in the Southern Arizona Desert. Tucson: Anthropological Papers of the University of Arizona 70 (2004).

Journal articles
Canal Irrigation at Casas Grandes: A Technological and Developmental Assessment of its Origins. In Culture and Contact: Charles C. DiPeso's Gran Chichimeca, Anne I. Woosley John C. Ravesloot, eds. (Albuquerque: University of New Mexico Press, 1993):133-151.
A Method for Distinguishing Between Prehistoric and Recent Water and Soil Control Features. Co-authored with James A. Neely and Michael D. Pool. Kiva 59:7-25 (1993).
The San Saba-Menard Irrigation System: Lessons Learned by Unraveling Its Origin. In Soil, Water, Biology, and Belief in Prehistoric and Traditional Southwestern Agriculture. H. Wolcott Toll, ed. Albuquerque: New Mexico Archaeological Council, Special Publication 2,pp. 263–277 (1995).
Indigenous Development of Mesoamerican Irrigation. Geographical Review 85:301-323 (1995).
 Innovation and Diffusion of Sand- and Gravel-Mulch Agriculture in the American Southwest:A Product of the Eruption of Sunset Crater. Quaternaire 9:61-69 (1998).
Noria Technology in Mexico: Against the Current and Against the Odds. International Molinology  59:8-13 (1999).
Learning to See the Impacts of Individuals. Geographical Review 91:423-429 (2001).
Channel Changes and Living Fencerows in Eastern Sonora, Mexico: Myopia in Traditional Resource Management? Geografiska Annaler 85A:247-261 (2003).
Permanent vs. Shifting Cultivation in the Eastern Woodlands of North America Prior to European Contact. Agriculture and Human Values 21:181-189 (2004).

References

External links
 Home Page 
 University of Texas Profile Page
 

Living people
American geographers
Fellows of the American Association for the Advancement of Science
University of Texas at Austin faculty
1947 births